"The Song That Doesn't End" (also referred to as "The Song That Never Ends") is a self-referential and infinitely iterative children's song. The song appears in an album by puppeteer Shari Lewis titled Lamb Chop's Sing-Along, Play-Along, released through a 1988 home video. It is a single-verse-long song, written in an infinite-loop motif in a march style, such that it naturally flows in a cyclical fashion, repeating the same verse over and over. It is still a very popular tune, typically sung during long car rides.  The song was written by Shari Lewis' long time producer Bernard Rothman.

Lyrics

(The song repeats endlessly.)

Variations
Alternative versions of the song use "never ends". Other minor discrepancies in the lyrics may be due to the song being passed in the oral tradition from kid-to-kid. Such differences include "It just goes on and on..." (line 2), "And we’ll continue" (line 4) and " and they continued" (line 4)

Notable appearances and recordings 
A version of the song was used as the closing theme of Lamb Chop's Play-Along, a 1992 televised puppet show on PBS. At the end of each episode, the puppets and children sang the verses of the song while hostess Shari Lewis would try in vain to stop them. They would eventually leave on her urging, even while beginning a sixth verse (which eventually fades away). Finally at the end of the end credits, the puppet character Charlie Horse would return and try to get to sing the song again, until Shari Lewis successfully stopped him for real by covering his mouth. Then, Lewis ordered him to "go away" (and not bring the song back in her sight again). As Charlie Horse obediently gets out of Lewis's sight, he slams the door (before Lewis could tell him not to).

A short rendition of the song appeared in a skit on the animated TV series Cartoon Planet (the skit is also featured on the companion album, Space Ghost's Musical Bar-B-Que). Brak sings the song until he is asked to stop by Zorak, who finds it annoying. Brak explains that he is unable to because it's the "song that doesn't end." He attempts to continue until Zorak loses his temper, causing Brak to cease, remarking, "I guess it just ended."

The song has been adopted as an unofficial anthem by disparate groups. The Discordian organization (or disorganization) known as POEE has listed the song in their material with claims that it was written by a member, while fans of the rock band Styx adopted a variation, "The Tour That Never Ends", to describe Styx's 400-plus date tour in the late 1990s in support of their album Brave New World. 

A series of Canadian Motrin pain reliever ads featured kids singing the song in the back of a car, during a traffic jam, while eating chocolate-covered coffee beans.

In the Annoying Orange episode "A Loud Place", Orange and his friends are singing the song at the beginning of the episode while in a band rehearsing.

In season 2 episode 10 of Good Girls, Annie Marks sings the version of the song with the lyrics "This is the song that never ends".

In an episode of Smart Guy, Yvette and Moe sing a version of this song to annoy a man while trying to win a car in a competition to see who can stay in the car the longest.

Jordan Raskopoulos (formerly of Axis of Awesome) sang a 5 hour 31 minute version (viewable on YouTube) and raised "a bunch of cash" for LGBTQIA+ youth organisation Twenty10.

See also 
 "John Jacob Jingleheimer Schmidt"
 Michael Finnegan (song)
 Campfire Song Song from SpongeBob's Greatest Hits

References 

Children's songs
Playground songs
1988 songs